The geology of the Kimberley, a region of Western Australia, is a rock record of early Proterozoic plate collision, orogeny and suturing between the Kimberley Craton and the Northern Australia Craton, followed by sedimentary basin formation from Proterozoic to Phanerozoic.   

The area formed in a slow tectonic plate collision during the Paleoproterozoic. The Kimberley Craton, which was moving south-eastwards, smashed into the North Australia Craton. The resulting series of deformations created the Hooper Complex and Lamboo Complex, which can be seen today along the southern margin of the Kimberley Craton. During the Proterozoic to Early Phanerozoic, the region had phases of mountain building (orogeny), faulting and sedimentary basin formation. Finally, the two cratons sutured, becoming one craton.

After the main phases of mountain-building, the shallow marine and river sediments were deposited on the Kimberley Craton. These sediments are called the Speewah and Kimberley Basins. Sediment deposition on these basins ended in the Late Paleozoic.

Other major Proterozoic events include the Yampi Orogeny (1400–1000 Ma) and Elatina Glaciation (~610 Ma). In the Paleozoic, there was the King Leopold Orogeny (~560 Ma), the Kalkarindji Continental Flood Basalt Province (~508 Ma), early Ordovician thermal subsidence, and the Canning Basin (Late Ordovician to Early Cretaceous
). During the Neogene, the region was bowed downwards as the Australian Plate met the Indian Plate.

General geography 

The Kimberley is the northernmost of the nine regions of Western Australia, with an area of 423,517 square kilometres (163,521 sq mi), about three times the size of England. Some towns in Kimberley are Broome, Derby, and Kununurra. Approximately 40% of the region's population is of Aboriginal descent.

The Kimberley consists of steep mountain belts to the northern side, with sandstone and limestone gorges cutting through. The northwestern side borders the Indian Ocean. Southern parts of the Kimberley are much flatter, consisting of mainly flat arid grasslands. The Kimberley is one of the hottest and driest regions of Australia, with a climate unfavourable to agriculture.

Tectonic evolution

Pre-Hooper Orogeny (> 1900 Ma) 
Earlier models of the Kimberley region suggested that, since the region's granitic composition is similar to the Paleoproterozoic granites found in other parts of Northern Australia, the region consisted of a stable Archaean cratonic basement.

This argument has since been challenged, because of newer magnetic and gravity data, indicate that the regional lithologies incorporated recycled orogenic and magmatic arc materials. This incorporation suggests that, rather than having a stable Archaean cratonic basement, the Kimberley Craton was likely shaped and reshaped by stages of magmatic and mountain-building episodes.

Newer models postulate a pre-1900 Ma convergent margin at the southeastern end of the Kimberley Craton, with the North Australian Craton being subducted under it. Convergence of the two cratons resulted in the advancement and accumulation of an exotic terrane (a fragment of the Kimberley Craton), termed crustal accretion, which could have instigated crustal growth.  Accretion of the terranes increased friction between the overlying and subducting plates, which probably impeded further slab subduction. This probably caused the deeper parts of the Northern Australian plate to break off (slab detachment and lithospheric delamination).

In the Western Zone, turbiditic sediments of the Marboo Formation began to be deposited around 1872 Ma, during post-collisional rifting of the Kimberley Craton and North Australian Craton.

Early Hooper Orogeny (1865-1856 Ma) 
Slab detachment removed the weight of the downgoing slab from the Northern Australian plate. This changed the lithospheric isostasy; the tendency of the plate to sink decreased. The loss of the descending slab also changed mantle flow traction. This caused a subduction polarity reversal; instead of the Northern Australian plate to the southeast subducting under the Kimberley plate to the northwest, as it had previously done, the Kimberley Craton began to subduct under the Northern Australian plate. The newly formed subduction zone began to form the Tickalara Oceanic Arc. Partial melting  was triggered by upwelling of hot aesthenospheric mantle associated with slab detachment.

Sedimentary rocks, mafic volcanic and volcaniclastic rocks deposited in the Central Zone are classified as the Tickalara Metamorphics, which were deformed and initially metamorphosed during the Hooper Orogeny (1865 - 1856 Ma ). It has been widely accepted that the development of the Tickalara Oceanic Arc signals the formation of the Central Zone. A viable alternative model explaining the genesis of the Tickalara Metamorphics is also included below for reference.

The freshly consolidated Marboo Formation experienced metamorphism of various grades throughout the Hooper Orogeny, along with extensive mafic intrusions, which were especially prominent during the earlier stages of the Hooper Orogeny. 

The newly-amalgamated Marboo Formation was then overlain by the felsic Whitewater Volcanics during a period of eruptions at around 1856 Ma.

A passive margin was developed linked to the North Australian Craton in the Eastern Zone, depositing siliciclastic and volcanic rocks of the Halls Creek Group. Deposition of the Halls Creek Group ceased during the final stages of Hooper Orogeny (around 1847 Ma).

Late Hooper Orogeny (1856-1850 Ma) 
Enhanced partial melting, as a result of further subduction during the later stages of Hooper Orogeny, produced widespread mafic-ultramafic intrusions in the Central Zone, with intrusions of the Paperbark Supersuite in the Western Zone, and the intrusions of the Panton Suite in the Eastern Zone.

The Tickalara Metamorphics were further deformed and metamorphosed up to the amphibolite and granulite metamorphic facies during the 1856-1850 Ma period of the Hooper Orogeny.

Post Hooper Orogeny (1850-1845 Ma) 
After the Hooper Orogeny, the downgoing slab, which had been deeply subducted into the asthenosphere, detached from the surface portion of the tectonic plate. The resulting change in isostasy temporarily buoyed the thinned-out Kimberley Craton section above the North Australian Craton, leading to the formation of the accretionary wedge of the Tickalara Arc and the prolusion of suturing between the Kimberley Craton and North Australian Craton.   

During this period the Tickalara Metamorphics in the Central Zone were intruded by tonalite and trondhjemite sheets, resulting in high-grade metamorphism. Further geochemical analysis have shown that the igneous intrusions have a chemical composition similar to that of other Phanerozoic continental margins, with a strong resemblance to known subduction, back-arc spreading, and island arc systems. This may support a oceanic island arc/back arc setting.

Halls Creek Orogeny (1835-1810 Ma) 
Halls Creek Orogeny is the first mountain-building event that affected all three zones of the Lamboo/Hooper Complex. It was caused by the convergence forces experienced between the plates' margins, and eventually began to suture the Kimberley Craton to the North Australian Craton.

The Sally Downs Supersuite, consisting of intrusions of felsic to mafic magma, mostly intruded into the Central Zone Tickalara Metamorphics, but also intermittently appears in the Eastern and Western Zones. The final fate of the North Australian Craton in relation to its now overlying Kimberley Craton is still debatable. The diagram provided below displays a full suture between the cratons. However, isotopic and geochemical data collected from the Sally Downs Supersuite have shown, in relationship to the exotic terrane, that the rock samples incorporated a portion of mantle-derived material. The geochemistry suggests that before a complete suture formed, the section of the North Australian Craton directly underlying the Kimberley Craton may have detached, instigating a short period of renewed northwest-dipping subduction (that is, the Northern Australian plate again subducting under the Kimberley plate).

The Halls Creek Orogeny also resulted in silica-rich sedimentary and felsic volcanic rocks, collectively termed the Speewah Group, being eroded from the new highlands and deposited over the Kimberley Craton. These deposits are called the Speewah and Kimberley Basins.

Speewah Basin (1835 Ma) 
The siliclastic sedimentary and felsic volcanic rocks of the Speewah Group began to be deposited into the Speewah Basin, east of the margin between Kimberley Craton and North Australian Craton, during and right after the Halls Creek Orogeny. Sediments of the Speewah Group have a maximum depth of 1.5 km, and thin significantly towards the west. They are deposited unconformably over the Western Zone, where deposition also overlapped with the deposition of the Kimberley Group. The depositional periods of the sediments were determined by observing volcanic rocks near the bottom of the basin, which indicates that the Speewah Basin formed and developed at the same time as the 1835 Ma granitic and gabbroic intrusions.

Kimberley Basin (1800 Ma) 
Discomformably overlaying the Speewah Group, the 3-km-deep Kimberley Basin consists of siliciclastic sedimentary and felsic volcanic rocks of the Kimberley Group (the group broadly includes the Moola Bulla, Red Rock, Texas Downs, and Revolver Creek). Paleocurrent data suggest that deposition of the Kimberley Group originated from a northern semi-enclosed shallow marine basin.

Alternative models 
There is still debate about the origin of the Tickalara Metamorphics. An alternative model exists, in which there is an ensialic basin (not an oceanic arc, as shown above) at the time of the Early Hooper Orogeny (1865-1856 Ma).

Ensialic marginal basin model 
Instead of the reversed subduction polarity shown in the 1865-1856 Ma Early Hooper Orogeny above, this model proposes that an ensialic marginal basin formed as the subduction zone progressively stepped back after colliding with continental fragments. The marginal basin may have closed during the late Hooper Orogeny and post-Hooper Orogeny, as a result of the deformation and metamorphism associated with the orogeny.

The intruded tonalite and tronghjemite sheets of the Tickalara Metamorphics may not be the product of the melting of mafic rocks alone; some older rocks may also have melted. This incorporation of older rocks is common in modern ensialic marginal basins.

Regional geology 

The current regional geology of the Kimberley can be divided into three major units:
 the Kimberley Craton (underlying the Speewah and Kimberley Basins)
 the Hooper Complex (also referred to as the Hooper Province)
 the Lamboo Complex (also referred to as the Lamboo Province).

Hooper and Lamboo Complexes 
The Lamboo Complex is a series of exposed and interconnected mountain (orogenic belts) belts, which run along the southeastern margin of the Kimberley Craton. The complex is further subdivided into the Western Zone, Central Zone, and Eastern Zone; each zone has different tectonic and stratigraphic characteristics. The Hooper Complex is similar to the Lamboo Complex, but it lies on the southwestern margin of the Kimberley Craton instead of the southeastern. The two complexes are therefore considered as two parts of a single feature, displaced from one another.  (see figure to the right). 

The three zones within the complexes differ from one another. Their geological characteristics were all formed during the early Paleoproterozoic, but in various tectonic settings, so the characteristics on either side of the zone boundaries don't match (see the 3 zones colored, in the figure to the right). Studies on the region's magnetic anomaly imply that the Western Zone and Central Zone did not collide against each other until the final stages of the Hooper Orogeny (mountain-building event), while the Western Zone and Central Zone did not collide until the final stages of Halls Creek Orogeny.

Western Zone 
The Western Zone is dominated by intrusive, course-grained, coeval granites, and gabbro. These belong to the Paperbark Supersuite of rocks, dating from 1865-1850 Ma. It also contains the 1870 Ma Marboo Formation, which is the oldest exposed rock unit in the Western Zone. The Marboo Formation consists of varying metamorphic grades of metamorphosed sedimentary rocks. Before they were metamorphosed, the rocks are thought to have been repeating layers of sandstone, siltstone, and mudstone deposited by turbidity currents. During the early deposition and consolidation stages of the Marboo Formation,  there were many intrusions of mafic magma, which formed rock bodies of varying sizes. The mafic intrusions and the sedimentary rocks they intruded metamorphosed together, and were later overlain by the eruptions of Whitewater Volcanics.

Central Zone 
The Central Zone is dominated by the Tickalara Metamorphics, which is 1865 Ma old, are the oldest rock unit in this zone. They incorporate metamorphosed sedimentary rocks similar to those in the Western Zone, from a similar deposition environment, but with higher grades (temperatures and or pressures) of metamorphism. It also contains some mafic volcanic and volcaniclastic rocks (metamorphosed between 1865–1856 Ma, and at 1850–1845 Ma. Before and during metamorphism, the Tickalara Metamorphics were intruded by layers of granites, tonalites and trondhjemites. The latter two types of rock are only created by high-grade metamorphism. The nature of the Tickalara Metamorphics' transition from sedimentary to volcanic and metamorphic suggests the formation and development of an oceanic island arc at around 1865 Ma. 

1845-1840 Ma before the present, the Tickalara Metamorphics were overlayed and encrusted with the eruption of mafic to felsic volcanic rocks of the Koongie Park Formation. During the 1835-1805 Ma Halls Creek Orogeny, the entire Central Zone was prominently intruded by granites and gabbros, which belong to the Sally Downs Supersuite.

Eastern Zone 
The Eastern Zone contains mafic and felsic volcanic rocks. These were intruded by the granitic rocks Ding Dong Downs Volcanics, at around 1910 Ma. Both were overlain unconformably by low-grade metamorphic-sedimentary and metamorphic-volcanic rocks, belonging to the Halls Creek Group (which were metamorphosed during the 1835-1805 Ma Halls Creek Orogeny, and later sutured to the zone by the intrusion of 1820-1810 Ma Sally Downs Supersuite). The basement of the Halls Creek Group consist of pure quartz sandstone, likely deposited in a fluvial depositional setting, which was later overlain unconformably by mafic, slightly felsic and alkaline volcanic rocks during 1880 Ma and 1857-1848 Ma.   

Studies on zircon ages of lithologies above the alkaline volcanics give convincing evidence that deposition of the upper sequences of Halls Creek Group paralleled metamorphic stages of the Central Zone. This, on top of studies of magnetic anomaly, conclusively indicate that the Eastern Zone could not have juxtaposed the Central Zone during that period.

References 

Geology of Western Australia